The 2022 European Individual Speedway Junior Championship was the 25th edition of the Championship. Three qualifying heats took place in Vetlanda (11 June), Žarnovica (30 July) and Plzeň (3 September).

The final was staged on 7 August, at Nagyhalász in Hungary and was won by Jesper Knudsen of Denmark.

Final
 17 September 2022
  Nagyhalász

 meeting abandoned after 16 heats (results stand)

See also 
 2022 Speedway European Championship

References

Individual Speedway Junior European Championship
European Junior Championship
International sports competitions hosted by Hungary